Joseph Casey Shaw (born July 20, 1975) is an American former basketball player who is the head coach of the boys varsity basketball team at Davidson Academy. Prior to his appointment at Davidson, he was an assistant coach for the Vanderbilt Commodores men's basketball team. Shaw played the center position. After a collegiate career at the University of Toledo, he was drafted 37th overall by the Philadelphia 76ers in the 1998 NBA draft.

Early life
He is the brother-in-law of former Valparaiso University star and NBA player Bryce Drew.

College career
In college, Shaw starred for the Toledo Rockets, averaging 13.8 points and 7.7 rebounds per game for his career, including 14.2ppg and 10rpg his senior year.

Professional career
Shaw was drafted as a 37th pick in the second round of the 1998 NBA Draft by the Philadelphia 76ers. He appeared in 9 games for the 76ers, scoring a total of two points.

He then moved to Italy in 2000, he would spend the majority of his career there, leading the league in rebounding in 2005. Shaw turned up for Olimpia Milano (two stints in 2002 and 2007), Cantù, Trieste, Virtus Roma, Reggio Calabria, Pesaro and Teramo in the Serie A.

He also played for Anwil Wloclawek in Poland, Gran Canaria and Melilla in Spain and Ventspils in Latvia.

On April 19, 2016, it was reported that Shaw would join his brother-in-law as an assistant coach at Vanderbilt University. After Bryce Drew was fired, Shaw was hired as the boys varsity basketball head coach at Davidson Academy.

References

External links
Vanderbilt Commodores coaching bio
Basketball Reference profile
Lega Basket Serie A profile Retrieved on 9 June 2015 
Liga ACB profile 

1975 births
Living people
American expatriate basketball people in Italy
American expatriate basketball people in Latvia
American expatriate basketball people in Poland
American expatriate basketball people in Spain
American men's basketball players
Basketball coaches from Ohio
Basketball players from Ohio
BK Ventspils players
CB Gran Canaria players
KK Włocławek players
Lega Basket Serie A players
Liga ACB players
Melilla Baloncesto players
Olimpia Milano players
Pallacanestro Cantù players
Pallacanestro Trieste players
Pallacanestro Virtus Roma players
Philadelphia 76ers draft picks
Philadelphia 76ers players
Sportspeople from Toledo, Ohio
Teramo Basket players
Toledo Rockets men's basketball players
Vanderbilt Commodores men's basketball coaches
Victoria Libertas Pallacanestro players
Viola Reggio Calabria players
Centers (basketball)